Osage Township is an inactive township in St. Clair County, in the U.S. state of Missouri.

Osage Township was erected in ca. 1890, taking its name from the Osage River.

References

Townships in Missouri
Townships in St. Clair County, Missouri